Rivals is a 1925 American silent comedy film featuring Oliver Hardy.

Cast
 Billy West as Billy
 Oliver Hardy as The Rival
 Ethelyn Gibson as Ethlyn (as Ethlyn Gibson)
 Ernie Young as Henry, the butler

See also
 List of American films of 1925
 Oliver Hardy filmography

External links

1925 films
1925 comedy films
1925 short films
American silent short films
American black-and-white films
Silent American comedy films
American comedy short films
1920s American films